Joseph Rucker Lamar Boyhood Home is the boyhood home of Joseph Rucker Lamar in Augusta, Georgia. Lamar served as Justice of the United States Supreme Court. The home was added to the National Register of Historic Places on June 13, 1996. It is located at 415 7th Street. The house was constructed in 1860. It is located in the Augusta Downtown Historic District, is the headquarters of Historic Augusta, and is used as a visitors center for the Boyhood Home of Woodrow Wilson.

See also
National Register of Historic Places listings in Richmond County, Georgia

References

Houses on the National Register of Historic Places in Georgia (U.S. state)
National Register of Historic Places in Augusta, Georgia
Houses completed in 1860
Houses in Augusta, Georgia
Individually listed contributing properties to historic districts on the National Register in Georgia (U.S. state)